The 2014 Jacksonville Jaguars season was the franchise's 20th season in the National Football League and the second under head coach Gus Bradley. They failed to improve upon their 4–12 record from 2013 and finished 3–13, and finished third in the AFC South for the second straight year. The Jaguars were eliminated from postseason contention after their week 12 loss to the Colts.

In week 13, the Jaguars had their biggest comeback in franchise history, defeating the New York Giants 25–24. The Jaguars trailed 21–0 in the first half, but outscored the Giants 25–3 in the second half, with the help of two defensive touchdowns. The Jaguars did not win a single road game during the season, the second time such a thing happened in franchise history.

Roster changes

Notable transactions

Acquisitions 
 DE Red Bryant, signed on March 8, 2014.
 G Zane Beadles, signed on March 11, 2014.
 RB Toby Gerhart, signed on March 11, 2014.
 LB Dekoda Watson, signed on March 12, 2014.
 DE Chris Clemons, signed on March 13, 2014.
 DT Ziggy Hood, signed on March 13, 2014.

Departures 
 G Uche Nwaneri, released on March 4, 2014.
 RB Justin Forsett, released on March 11, 2014.
 RB Maurice Jones-Drew, declared free agent on March 11, 2014.
 LB Russell Allen, released on April 17, 2014.
 G Will Rackley, released on May 12, 2014.
 DE Jason Babin, released on June 19, 2014.
 G/C Mike Brewster, released on August 29, 2014.
 SS Winston Guy, released on September 29, 2014.

Trades
 QB Blaine Gabbert was traded to the San Francisco 49ers on March 11, 2014 for a sixth-round pick in the 2014 NFL Draft and a conditional pick in the 2015 NFL Draft.

Draft

Draft trades
 The Jaguars traded their original third- and one of their two fifth-round selections — Nos. 70 and 150 overall — to the San Francisco 49ers in exchange for the 49ers' second-round selection (No. 61 overall). The Jaguars previously acquired the No. 150 selection in a trade that sent wide receiver Mike Thomas to the Detroit Lions.
 The Jaguars acquired an additional third-round selection (No. 93 overall) in a trade that sent the team's original fourth- and sixth-round selections (Nos. 105 and 179 overall, respectively) to the New England Patriots.
 The Jaguars acquired additional fourth- and fifth-round selections (Nos. 114 and 159 overall, respectively) in a trade that sent offensive tackle Eugene Monroe to the Baltimore Ravens.
 The Jaguars acquired an additional sixth-round selection (No. 205 overall) in a trade that sent quarterback Blaine Gabbert to the San Francisco 49ers.

Undrafted rookie free agents
The following is a list of notable rookie free agents signed by the Jaguars after the 2014 NFL Draft:

Staff

Final roster

Schedule

Preseason

Regular season

Note: Intra-division opponents are in bold text.
 #  Blue/Red indicates the International Series game in London.

Game summaries

Week 1: at Philadelphia Eagles

Week 2: at Washington Redskins

Week 3: vs. Indianapolis Colts

Week 4: at San Diego Chargers

Week 5: vs. Pittsburgh Steelers

Week 6: at Tennessee Titans

Week 7: vs. Cleveland Browns

Week 8: vs. Miami Dolphins

Week 9: at Cincinnati Bengals

Week 10: vs. Dallas Cowboys
NFL International Series

Week 12: at Indianapolis Colts

Week 13: vs. New York Giants

Week 14: vs. Houston Texans

Week 15: at Baltimore Ravens

Week 16: vs. Tennessee Titans

Week 17: at Houston Texans

Standings

Division

Conference

References

External links
 

Jacksonville
Jacksonville Jaguars seasons
Jacksonville Jaguars